4151 Alanhale, provisional designation , is a carbonaceous Themistian asteroid from the outer region of the asteroid belt, approximately 19 kilometers in diameter. It was discovered by the American astronomer couple Carolyn and Eugene Shoemaker at the U.S. Palomar Observatory, California, on 24 April 1985. It was named for American astronomer Alan Hale.

Orbit and classification 

Alanhale is a member of the Themis family, a dynamical family of outer-belt asteroids with nearly coplanar ecliptical orbits. It orbits the Sun in the outer main-belt at a distance of 2.7–3.6 AU once every 5 years and 7 months (2,038 days). Its orbit has an eccentricity of 0.14 and an inclination of 1° with respect to the ecliptic.

Physical characteristics 

Alanhale has been characterized as a dark C-type asteroid by PanSTARRS photometric survey.

Rotation period 

A rotational lightcurve of Alanhale was obtained from photometric observations made at the U.S. Palomar Transient Factory in October 2010. The fragmentary lightcurve gave a rotation period of  hours with a low brightness variation of 0.07 in magnitude.

Diameter and albedo 

According to the surveys carried out by NASA's spaced-based Wide-field Infrared Survey Explorer and its subsequent NEOWISE mission, Alanhale measures 19.5 and 22.7 kilometers in diameter, respectively, with a corresponding albedo of 0.07 and 0.05. The Collaborative Asteroid Lightcurve Link assumes an albedo of 0.08 and calculates a smaller diameter of 15.4 kilometers with an absolute magnitude of 12.43.

Naming 

This minor planet was named in honor of American astronomer Alan Hale (born 1958), co-discoverer of comet Hale–Bopp.

His precise visual observations include more than 130 comets, several at more than one apparition, and both, magnitude estimates and confirmations of discoveries. Hale has promoted the study of small Solar System bodies in articles and in his astronomy lectures. The official naming citation was published by the Minor Planet Center on 28 April 1991.

References

External links 
 Asteroid Lightcurve Database (LCDB), query form (info )
 Dictionary of Minor Planet Names, Google books
 Asteroids and comets rotation curves, CdR – Observatoire de Genève, Raoul Behrend
 Discovery Circumstances: Numbered Minor Planets (1)-(5000) – Minor Planet Center
 
 

004151
Discoveries by Carolyn S. Shoemaker
Discoveries by Eugene Merle Shoemaker
Named minor planets
19850424